Crab also known as Old Crab and Mr. Panton's Crab (1722 – December 1750) was a British Thoroughbred racehorse. After retiring from racing he became a successful stallion and was British Champion sire in 1748, 1749 and 1750. He was owned by the 1st Earl of Portmore until purchased by Mr. Cotton and then Thomas Panton.

Background
Crab was a grey colt bred by Charles Pelham and was foaled in 1722. He was a son of Alcock's Arabian out of a daughter of Basto. He was sold to David Colyear, 1st Earl of Portmore when he was young.

Although grey was a fairly common color in the foundation stock of the Thoroughbred, it became increasingly rare over time. All modern grey Thoroughbreds descend from Crab through his great-great-granddaughter Bab (foaled 1787) and her great-great-grandson Drone (1823).

Racing career
Crab first race came in 1727, when he finished fourth in a 20 guineas sweepstakes at Newmarket. He was then sold to Mr. Cotton. His first intended race for Mr. Cotton was at Newmarket in April 1728 against Weaver, but Weaver's owner, Lord Milsintown, paid a forfeit and the race never took place. In the following October he beat the Duke of Bolton's Cleopatra in a 500 guineas race over four miles. In April 1729 he won the King's Plate at Newmarket, beating the Duke of Hamilton's Victorious and Mr. Williams's Spot. The following May he became lame when running in an 80 guineas plate at Stamford and never raced again.

Stud career
As a stallion he stood for Thomas Panton at Newmarket. He became a successful sire and was British Champion sire in 1748, 1749 and 1750. His progeny included King's Plate winners Brilliant, Bustard, Grasshopper, Othello, Sloe and Spinster. Crab died in December 1750.

Pedigree

Sire line tree

Crab
Grey Ward
Crab (Routh)
Valiant
Rib
Sober John
Sloe
Sweeper
Bustard
Dorimond
Gamahoe
Othello (Portmore)
Allworthy
Locust
Oroonoko
Brunswick
Black-and-all-Black
Spectator
Pagan
Sulfur
Mark Anthony
Aimwell
Vandal
Brilliant
Antelope
Crab (Cumberland)
Milksop
Crab (Shepherd)
Lath (Protector)
Laburnum
Tippoo Saib
Othello (Kingston)
True Briton
Selim

References

1722 racehorse births
1750 racehorse deaths
British Champion Thoroughbred Sires
Racehorses trained in the Kingdom of Great Britain
Racehorses bred in the Kingdom of Great Britain
Thoroughbred family 9-a
Individual male horses